Ragasiya Snehithane is a 2008 Indian Tamil-language horror thriller film written and directed by Sujo Visanth. The film stars  Lakshmi Rai along with newcomers Vasanth, Vijayraj, Prakash, Kandan, and Sriram, with Jayasurya, Charan Raj, Mahanadhi Shankar, Sethu Vinayagam, Hemalatha, Gowthami Vembunathan, M. S. Bhaskar, Pandu, Crane Manohar, and Bava Lakshmanan playing supporting roles. The film had musical score by John Peter, cinematography by K. G. Sankar, and editing by R. T. Annadurai. The film was released on 22 August 2008 after many delays.

Plot
After graduating from college, Vasanth (Vasanth), Vijay (Vijayraj), Arun (Prakash) and Karthik (Kandan) have decided to stay in their rented house in Chennai while their friend Sakthi (Sriram) returns to his native village. Vasanth's girlfriend Jennifer (Lakshmi Rai) then comes to live with them. Later, Sakthi returns to the city and begins to behave strangely. Meanwhile, the rowdy Jayasurya (Jayasurya) is sought by the police. Jennifer, who bumps into Jayasurya at the local market, informs the police and the police inspector (Charan Raj), who arrests him.

The six jobless friends are desperate to find a decent job and decide to steal from a minister (Sethu Vinayagam) who had black money. Posing as income tax officers, they conduct a surprise raid at the minister's house during his absence and secretly rob 30 crores of rupees. The minister then finds out the identities of the robbers. Meanwhile, Jayasurya escapes from jail with the help of the corrupt sub-inspector Shankar (Mahanadi Shankar), and the minister gives Jayasurya the mission of killing the six people.

The friends are now hiding in a forest near Talakonam waterfalls. Jayasurya, who eventually finds their place, attacks Sakthi when he was swimming alone in the falls. Later that night, the five friends find Sakthi's wounded body. Upset by the demise of their friend, they bury him with his share of the stolen money. Thereafter, Karthik, Arun, and Vijay are mysteriously murdered one by one. The killer turns out to be Sakthi.

In the past, Sakthi and his sister (Hemalatha) were ill-treated by their greedy stepmother (Gowthami Vembunathan). His sister had to prostitute herself to pay his college fees. When he returned to his native village, Sakthi found his sister having sex with another man and was shocked. Sakthi later killed the man and slowly turned into a psychopath who could do anything for money. In the forest, Sakthi faked his own death with the help of Jayasurya. He then killed Jayasurya and started killing his friends one by one.

Sakthi finally murders Jennifer and then reveals everything to the lone survivor Vasanth. In the meantime, Shankar comes to the forest with Sakthi's sister in order to steal their money. During the fight, Sakthi manages to kill Shankar, and his sister tries to convince him to stop his killing rampage. Sakthi, who is in a psychotic state, does not listen to her and tries to kill Vasanth. Sakthi's sister has no other choice but to kill Sakthi.

Cast

Vasanth as Vasanth
Lakshmi Rai as Jennifer
Vijayraj as Vijay
Prakash as Arun
Kandan as Karthik
Sriram as Sakthi
Jayasurya as Jayasurya
Mahanadi Shankar as Sub-Inspector Shankar
Sethu Vinayagam as Minister
Hemalatha as Sakthi's sister
Gowthami Vembunathan as Sakthi's stepmother
M. S. Bhaskar as Minister's friend
Pandu as College Principal
Crane Manohar as Office Manager
Bava Lakshmanan as Nair
Megha
Hasina
Muthu
P. Venkatesh
V. Akilan
Charan Raj as Police inspector (guest appearance)

Production
Newcomer Sujo Visanth began work on a horror film titled Kurukkezhuthu in 2004, writing the story, screenplay and dialogues for the project. Many newcomers were chosen to play the lead roles. The film was shot in Chennai and Talakonam. Lakshmi Rai, who hailed from Belgaum, was cast to play the heroine and it was supposed to be her first film. In 2005, the title was changed from Kurukkezhuthu to Azhagiya Aabathu and the film remained unreleased due to unknown reasons. Prior to the 2008 release, the title was changed to Ragasiye Snehithane.

Soundtrack

The film score and the soundtrack were composed by John Peter. The soundtrack features 5 tracks.

References

2008 films
2000s Tamil-language films
Indian horror thriller films
Films shot in Chennai
2008 directorial debut films